State Highway 495 (SH 495) is a state highway in the U.S. state of Texas that runs between Mission and Alamo in Deep South Texas.  This route was designated in 2001, replacing Farm to Market Road 495.  This route runs parallel to US 83 for its entire route. In McAllen, the route is also known as Pecan Blvd.

Route description 
SH 495 begins at SH 364 (La Homa Road) in Palmview near I-2/US 83.  The highway heads east along Pecan Boulevard through Mission to an intersection with SH 107 (Conway Avenue).  It has an intersection with FM 494 (Shary Road) before entering McAllen.  In McAllen, the highway has several major intersections with Farm to Market Roads to include FM 2220 (Ware Road), FM 1926 (23rd Street), SH 336 (10th Street) and FM 2061 (McColl Street).  As it enters Pharr, the highway passes under I-69C/US 281 with intersections with the freeway's frontage roads.  The highway continues east into Alamo to an intersection with FM 907.  The highway continues east to its eastern terminus at FM 1423 (Val Verde Road).

History 
SH 495 began as FM 495 on June 26, 1945, running from Ware Rd., northwest of McAllen east to Val Verde Rd., northeast of Alamo. On February 25, 1949, the route extended south to US 83. On September 7, 1949, the section from FM 1423 to US 83 was transferred to FM 1423. On December 17, 1952, the route was extended west to SH 107 on the north side of Mission. On August 29, 1989, it was again extended west, this time to connect with U.S. Route 83 in Palmview.  The route was then transferred to SH 495 on January 23, 2001, and was extended westward to Abram Road to make a new connection with US 83. One section was transferred to SH 364. However, at least one light still shows the street as FM 495.

Junction list

References

495
Pharr, Texas
Transportation in Hidalgo County, Texas